Golden State is an indie rock band from Los Angeles, California. Band members include former Paloalto vocalist James Grundler (vocals/guitar), Marc Boggio (guitar), Kemble Walters (drums), and Elias Reidy (bass), formerly of The Red Jumpsuit Apparatus.

Biography
Vocalist James Grundler is known for heading Los Angeles-based band Paloalto.  Paloalto's two studio albums were produced by Rick Rubin and released through American Recordings.  James was also in San Luis Obispo, California-based band The Din Pedals.

Golden State has two singles that were featured on the Discovery Channel show Deadliest Catch: “All Roads Lead Home” and “Bombs.” “All Roads Lead Home” was also featured on episodes of the Canadian TV series Flashpoint, and Heartland
as well as on the soundtrack for the movie Dolphin Tale.

"Save Me", from their debut album Division, has another version recorded and released separately that features Tyler Blackburn on vocals and is the theme song to webseries Wendy (starring Meaghan Martin).

Their song "Till the End" was used as the official theme for the BBC's coverage of the 2011 Royal Wedding of Prince William & Catherine Middleton.

The band's song "Bombs" was featured as the opening song of an episode of the TV series Gossip Girl.

Their song "Take Me Out" is featured in the trailer and soundtrack for the film Cavemen.

Line-up

Current
 James Grundler – lead vocalist
 Marc Boggio – guitar
 Elias Reidy – bass guitar
 Kemble Walters – drums

Former
 Fern Sanchez – drums
 Kameron Waters – drums
 Robb Torres – guitar
 Tommy Black – bass guitar
 Noah Stone – guitar
 Alex Parnell – bass guitar
 Adam D'Zurilla – bass guitar

Discography

Studio albums

EPs

Singles
 "Destroyer" (March 11, 2011)
 "All Roads Lead Home" (July 19, 2011)
 "Bombs (End This War)" (May 11, 2012)
 "Rocket" (January 26, 2013)
 "Love Song" (feat. Holly Conlan) (January 27, 2013)
 "A Triumphant Return" (May 7, 2013)
 "Take Me Out" (January 5, 2014)
 "Take Me Home" (June 24, 2014)
 "Wolves" (July 15, 2014)
 "Head On" (February 8, 2015)
 "Gold" (June 10, 2015)
 "Race" (March 25, 2019)
 "Eyesore" (October 13, 2020)

References

External links
 Official Golden State Band Website
Golden State Facebook website
Golden State MySpace website
Ron Paul "iTunes Bomb" organized by the band

Indie rock musical groups from California
Musical groups from Los Angeles